Śāktô Rāsa (Śākta Rāsa, Shaakta Raash, Shaakta Raasa or Shaakto Raas) is the most celebrated festival of Nabadwip & Dainhat, West Bengal, India. This festival is celebrated thirty-five days after the autumnal Durgā Pūjā celebration or fifteen days after Kālī Pūjā in Kartik Purnima. To the people of Nabadwip & Dainhat, Rash Festival is everything. The entire commonwealth eagerly waits for this festival all the year round.

The main features of Nabadwip and Dainhat Rash are to make huge Mūrtis with clay and to worship Shakti. Every Mūrti has an artistic design, a variety of imagination, religious discourse, and deep understanding of the scholars, which help entertain innumerable people. Cartoonist Chandi Lahiri said that the hugeness of clay Mūrtis differs from any other festival as Nabadwip's and Dainhat's Mūrtis are shapely and symmetric despite their light weight and enormous proportions.

Historical groundings 
Ras festival mainly part of Vaishnavism. In the time of Chaitanya deb or some years earlier, Rash Yatra was started in Nabadwip. But it was Vaishnabic festival. Shakta ras is totally different from that. Sakta Ras festival may be older than Vaishnava Ras, because in the beginning, idols were worshipped in Patachitra. During the time of Krishnachandra and mainly Girishchandra, Nabadwip Rash yatra became popular. Krishna Chandra and Girishchandra spent much money to popularise the festival and since then worshipping started through clay idol.

Girish Chandra Basu highlighted the first glimpse of Nabadwip Ras. In 1853–1860, he was a daroga of Nabadwip-Shantipur and Krishnanagar. In his book Sekaler Daroga Kahini (published 1888 AD), he wrote various socio-cultural reports along with the geographical location of the Nabadwip of that time.

Kali puja and Ras festival 
Nabadwip is a sanctum of Tantra. Many Shakta and Tantra philosophers worshipped Devi kali even before the Shakta Ras Festival began. Later these Kali idols were worshipped in Ras festival. Since the twelfth or fourteenth century, tantra has been enriched with tendance of Tantra philosophers throughout Bengal.

Conflict with Vaishnavism 
In the early 16th century, some Vaishnavite scholars started the Vaishnavic movement. So it was an obvious conflict with Shakta followers who were worshipping Tantra.

Shakta ras in early days 
Documentation of early days of Shakta ras is very rare as flood and earthquake hit several times. Although Girish Chandra Basu and Kanti Chandra Rari gave glimpse of Shakta ras in early days.

Girish Chandra Basu 
Girish Chandra Basu, Daroga of Nabadwip-Shantipur-Krishnagar, wrote "Sekaler Daroga Kahini, where he described socio-cultural view of Nadia. He wrote,

Description 
Girish Babu's description gives an idea about 19th century Ras utsav. Bindhyobasini was worshiped in Purangunge. This place is now ruined. In 1853-60 he saw Purangunge in right place. After that in 1871 Purangunge was ruined by Ganga due to erosion. Then Bindhyabasini deity transferred to Sribasangan. But due to some internal problem puja committee had split into two organising committees. And one committee worshiped Bindhyabasini in Sribasangan and other one started Gourangini puja near Jognathtala.

Kanti Chandra Rari 
Historian Kanti Chandra Rari also wrote about Nabadwip Ras in his book Nabadwip Mahima. There he confirmed that Shakta Ras jatra had been celebrated since long year back. He wrote,

Glory of the Mūrtis
Cartoonist Chandi Lahiri said about the glory of the Mūrtis worshiped in Nabadwip Rash jatra,

References

Festivals in West Bengal
Festivals in India
Culture of West Bengal
Bengali culture
Bengali Hindu festivals